Alcina Lubitch Domecq (born 1953) is an Israeli short story writer.  She was born in Guatemala to an Auschwitz survivor father, and an Iberian-Guatemalan mother.  After her parents' divorced, she moved to Mexico in the sixties and left in the early 1970s.  After a stay in Europe, she made aliyah to Israel where she now works as a janitor in a Haifa hospital.
Her works include The Mirror's Mirror: or, The Noble Smile of the Dog (1983) and Intoxicada (1984); she has had short stories, focusing mainly on the Jewish condition, published in many anthologies.

References

1953 births
Living people
Guatemalan women short story writers
Guatemalan short story writers
Guatemalan Jews
Israeli people of Guatemalan descent
Guatemalan people of Spanish descent
Guatemalan people of German descent
Guatemalan emigrants to Israel
Israeli women short story writers
Israeli short story writers
North American people of Israeli descent
20th-century Israeli women writers
20th-century Israeli writers
21st-century Israeli women writers
21st-century Israeli writers
20th-century Guatemalan women writers
21st-century Guatemalan women writers